The Ford Ladies' Classic was a women's professional golf tournament in England on the Ladies European Tour (LET).

The tournament was held at Woburn Golf and Country Club in Milton Keynes, Buckinghamshire; first played on the Duke's Course (1982–84), it moved to the Duchess Course in 1985. The last edition in 1995 was held at Chart Hills Golf Club in Biddenden, Kent.

Winners

References

External links
Ladies European Tour

Former Ladies European Tour events
Golf tournaments in England